Wynia is a surname. Notable people with the surname include:

 Ann Wynia (born 1943), American politician
 Gerben Wynia (born 1958), Dutch literary essayist and biographer
 Matthew K. Wynia (born 1964), American physician and bioethicist